"Holler" is a song by American R&B singer Ginuwine. It was co-written by Lushone "Nikki" Siplin and Timbaland and produced by the latter for his debut studio album Ginuwine...the Bachelor (1996). The song was released as the album's sixth and final single and became a UK top 15 hit.

Track listing

Notes
 denotes additional producer

Charts

References

1996 songs
1997 singles
Ginuwine songs
Song recordings produced by Timbaland
Songs written by Timbaland
Songs written by Ginuwine
Hip hop soul songs